Jeunesse Sportive d'El Massira is a football club based in Laâyoune, Western Sahara. The club was founded in 1977 and plays in the Botola 2 as of the 2021–22 season.

Current squad

Honours
Promotion to Botola/GNF 1: 1
1994/95

Sport equipment
 Adidas

References

Laayoune
Association football clubs established in 1977
1970s establishments in Western Sahara
Football in Western Sahara